Chris Cantada is a Filipino musician, vlogger and cosplayer best known as the former drummer and backing vocalist of the band Sponge Cola. 

He was featured in the music video of Sponge Cola's "Tambay" in a cameo guest appearance per post band departure.

Cantada released his solo album Heartbeat with the carrier single of the same name. The music video for "Heartbeat" shows Cantada played all musical instruments for the song.

Departure statement
This was a message from Erwin “Armo” Armovit (lead guitarist) in a certain fansite:

Career

Sponge Cola
The band made up of Yael Yuzon (vocals, guitar), Gosh Dilay (bass), Erwin Armovit (lead guitar) and Chris Cantada (drums) were all college buddies from the Ateneo de Manila University. Sponge Cola's debut album Palabas, was released in 2004 under Sony BMG, spawning radio hits like "KLSP", "Gemini", and "Jeepney".

Sponge Cola's acoustic live cover of the Madonna classic "Crazy for You" gained popularity among fans and casual listeners after it became an Internet download favorite.

Right after finishing college, the quartet immediately dished out their second record, Transit, under Universal Records in 2006. The album found a more focused unit as proven by the strong radio singles like the anthemic "Bitiw", "Tuliro" and "Pasubali".

Sponge Cola also graced two of the most successful tribute records come out recently: The Eraserheads' Ultraelectromagneticjam where they did a cover of "Pare Ko" and the APO Hiking Society's two-volume disc Kami nAPO Muna ("Nakapagtataka") and Kami nAPO Muna Ulit ("Saan Na Nga Ba Ang Barkada").

Sponge Cola's eponymous third album under Universal Records was released on September 19, 2008 and launched on September 26 at Eastwood in Libis Quezon City.

Cantada's departure however was done gradually because he was still in the band's forthcoming videos and TV appearances meant to promote new records. Sponge Cola hired session drummers to fill in Cantada's slot during live gigs, until Tedmark Cruz was officially announced as the new drummer in 2009.

Solo
After leaving Sponge Cola for three years due to health problems, Cantada released his solo debut album entitled Heartbeat (all songs written by Cantada himself), distributed under Universal Records and co-produced by Yael Yuzon. The music video of his carrier single also titled "Heartbeat" was released in 2011.

Cantada's music video of the song "Jillian" was released in 2013. Sponge Cola was a featured artist in the music video with Cantada on guitar and vocals, Yael Yuzon on drums, Gosh Dilay on bass, Armo Armovit on guitar and Tedmark Cruz on percussion. The song title is a reference to Cantada's wife Jillian Gatcheco-Cantada. "Jillian" was first featured in Sponge Cola's debut studio album Palabas which was released in 2004 and was written and sang by Cantada himself in the album.

Cantada is also a known vlogger and cosplayer under the name Chris Cantada Force.

Discography

With Sponge Cola
Albums 
Palabas (2004) 
Transit (2006) 
Sponge Cola (2008)
EPs
Sponge Cola EP

Solo
Albums
Heartbeat (2011)

References

External links

1985 births
Living people
21st-century Filipino musicians
Ateneo de Manila University alumni
Place of birth missing (living people)
Universal Records (Philippines) artists